Chromagrion is a genus of aurora damsels in the damselfly family Coenagrionidae. There is one described species in Chromagrion, C. conditum.

References

External links

 

Coenagrionidae
Articles created by Qbugbot
Monotypic Odonata genera
Insects described in 1876